William Edward Stack (October 24, 1887 – August 28, 1958) was a pitcher in Major League Baseball from 1910 to 1914.

References

External links

1887 births
1958 deaths
Major League Baseball pitchers
Brooklyn Dodgers players
Chicago Cubs players
Philadelphia Phillies players
St. Viator Irish football players
Baseball players from Chicago